The Popopopops is a Rennes-based band formed in 2007. and made up of Victor Solf (vocals and keyboards), Vincent Bessy (Guitar), Guillaume Halbique (drums) and Simon Carpentier (bass).

The band won the Autumn 2009 CQFD competition. The band was also part of La Blogotheque's City Series: Rennes.

Discography

Albums
2013: Swell

References

Breton musical groups
Musical groups established in 2007
Rennes